The 2001–02 Washington Huskies men's basketball team represented the University of Washington for the 2001–02 NCAA Division I men's basketball season. Led by ninth-year head coach Bob Bender, the Huskies were members of the Pacific-10 Conference and played their home games on campus at Hec Edmundson Pavilion in 

Last played in 1990, the conference tournament resumed  this season, with eight teams qualifying. Washington drew top seed Oregon in the opening  the teams had split the season series with  
At the Staples Center in Los Angeles, the Huskies led by seven points at the half, but the Ducks dominated the second half and won by 

Twelve days later, Bender was relieved of his duties by athletic director Barbara  He was succeeded in early April by alumnus   the head coach at Saint Louis, who led the Husky program for fifteen seasons.

Postseason result

|-
!colspan=5 style=| Pacific-10 Tournament

References

External links
Sports Reference – Washington Huskies: 2001–02 basketball season

Washington Huskies men's basketball seasons
Washington Huskies
Washington
Washington